The Quezette Stakes is a Melbourne Racing Club Group 3 Thoroughbred horse race for three-year-old fillies held under set weights with penalties conditions, over a distance of 1100 metres, held at Caulfield Racecourse, Melbourne, Australia annually in August.  Total prizemoney for the race is A$200,000.

History

Name
The race first held in 1992 is in honour of the 1967 Merson Cooper Stakes (Listed Race) winner Quezette, who won seven races in her two-year-old season and was placed in the Group 1 Crown Oaks as a three-year-old. Quezette established the Australian record for five furlongs in 56.4 seconds. In 2016 the event was run as the Winslow Group Stakes.

Distance
 1992–2005 – 1200 metres
 2006 onwards - 1100 metres

Grade
 1994–2012 - Listed race
 2013 -  Group 3 status

Venue
1992–1996 - Sandown Park Racecourse
1997 - Caulfield Racecourse 
1998–2001 - Sandown Park Racecourse
2002 onwards - Caulfield Racecourse

Winners

2022 - Bound For Home
2021 - Gimmie Par
2020 - Bella Nipotina
2019 - Exhilarates
2018 - Sunlight
2017 - Crown Witness
2016 - I Am A Star
2015 - Petits Filous
2014 - Sabatini
2013 - Kiss A Rose
2012 - Elite Elle
2011 - Satin Shoes
2010 - Panipique
2009 - Corsaire
2008 - Viennese
2007 - Bel Mer
2006 - La Vie Amour 
2005 - Pinezero 
2004 - Alinghi  
2003 - French Bid  
2002 - Innovation Girl  
2001 - La Lagune  
2000 - So Gorgeous
1999 - Stella Artois
1998 - Bright Side 
1997 - Accept
1996 - Ascorbic
1995 - Bracken Bank
1994 - Love Of Mary
1993 - Tristalove
1992 - Minsky Lass

See also
 List of Australian Group races
 Group races

References

Horse races in Australia
Caulfield Racecourse